The Very Best of Lou Reed is a compilation album by American rock musician Lou Reed, released on May 16, 2000 by RCA Records.

Track listing
 "Perfect Day"
 "Walk on the Wild Side"
 "Vicious"
 "Rock and Roll Heart"
 "The Gun"
 "I Love You, Suzanne"
 "Caroline Says II"
 "Men of Good Fortune"
 "My Friend George"
 "Lisa Says"
 "I Want to Boogie with You"
 "Ocean"
 "The Last Shot"
 "I Wanna be Black"
 "Sally Can't Dance"
 "Coney Island Baby"
 "Berlin"
 "Satellite of Love"

Charts

References

2000 greatest hits albums
Lou Reed compilation albums